George Louis Bettcher (1862–1952) was an American architect based in Denver, Colorado. He designed a number of buildings which survive and are listed on the National Register of Historic Places for their architecture.

Biography 
George Louis Bettcher was born in 1862 in Jersey City, New Jersey. He moved to Denver in 1895. He was part of the Unitarian Church. Bettcher was a member of the American Institute of Architects (AIA).  

According to the NRHP nomination of the Rossonian Hotel (1912), "he was best known for his residential design work, primarily in the Denver Country Club area." He designed the Stedman Elementary School (1925), which holds cultural significance and was an important school for racial integration efforts in Denver (after Keyes v. School District No. 1). 

His work is included in the collections at the Western History and Genealogy Repository at the Denver Public Library.

Works 
Helene Apartment Building (1904), 1052 Pearl Street, Denver, Colorado
Rossonian Hotel (1912), 2650 Welton Street, Denver, Colorado; NRHP-listed
Kappler–Cannon–Fieger House (1912), 1904 Kearny Street, Denver, Colorado
Denver Turnverein (1921), Denver, Colorado; this is Denver's oldest ethnic club building, originally the "Coronado Club"
Stedman Elementary School (1925), 940 Dexter Street, Denver, Colorado
Altamaha Apartments, 1490 Lafayette Street, Denver, Colorado; NRHP-listed
First National Bank of Douglas County (Masonic Hall), 300 Wilcox Street, Castle Rock, Colorado; NRHP-listed
F. C. Bray House, Denver, Colorado
The Polyanna House (or Insley House), Leavenworth, Kansas

See also 

 National Register of Historic Places listings in downtown Denver
 National Register of Historic Places listings in northeast Denver

References

1862 births
1952 deaths
American architects 
Architects from Colorado
People from Jersey City, New Jersey
20th-century American architects